Aston University Engineering Academy is a university technical college (UTC) that opened in September 2012 in the Gosta Green area of Birmingham, West Midlands, England. Aston University is the lead academic sponsor of the UTC, along with the Science, Technology, Engineering and Mathematics Network. Business partners of Aston University Engineering Academy include E.ON, Goodrich Corporation, National Grid plc, PTC and the Royal Air Force.

The new purpose-built school building of the UTC is located at the edge of the Aston University campus.

Admissions
Aston University Engineering Academy has an initial intake of students aged 14 and 16 (academic years 10 and 12) in 2012, but will expand to accommodate students aged 14 to 19 over the following two years. The schools catchment area covers the entirety of the Birmingham metropolitan borough.

Description
Aston University Engineering Academy takes pupils from Year 10. It specialises in engineering and associated work-related learning. At key stage 4, pupils undertake a vocational curriculum alongside an academic GCSE curriculum. At key stage 5, most pupils undertake a BTEC extended diploma and a single A level. The school did not meet the government's current floor standard, the minimum standard for pupils’ progress at the end of key stage 4, when the school was inspected in 2018.

Aston University Engineering Academy specialises in different aspects of engineering. Pupils aged 14 to 16 study a core selected number of GCSEs along with either a Higher Diploma in Engineering or BTEC First Diploma in Engineering.

For sixth form education, students can choose between four study programmes:

 An Advanced Diploma in Engineering and an additional A Level
 BTEC National Diploma in Engineering and an additional A Level 
 Mathematics and Science A levels programme
 Apprenticeships

The school has struggled to find and retain teacher. It needs teachers who have deep specialist knowledge in areas where there is a national teacher shortage, to work with youngsters who have in the main had a disrupted past. Some youngsters still have some catching up to do following the previous turbulence. Teaching is not yet consistently strong enough to counter the historical issues and the turbulence encountered by the students. The students are in the main cooperative and proud of their school.

The building
The academy building is a new-build scheme, built on the site of a former manufacturing facility demolished many years before. It backs onto the Grand Union Canal and is opposite Faraday Wharf, and within easy walking distance of the sponsors Aston University campus. The scheme formed part of Birmingham's Building Schools for the Future programme before it was cancelled, and as such was built by Lend Lease. The Architect was Feilden Clegg Bradley Studios, with civil and structural consultants Cox Turner Morse, and building services consultants Cundall.

The academy comprises approximately 6,500m² of accommodation over 3 floors (excluding basements). Unusually, due to changes in ground level from front to back of the site, the main entrance is at first floor level, with the reception area opening out into a triple-height atrium and staircase at the heart of the building. Site constraints, and the proximity to the inner ring road of Dartmouth Middleway, required the building to be very compact and needed to insulate the occupants from external traffic noise and poor air quality. Consequently, the building has a high performance sealed facade and glazing system, and required a heavily serviced solution to provide the necessary heating, ventilation and comfort cooling for the occupants. To offset potentially high energy consumption and running costs, the services design incorporates a full fresh air ventilation system with free cooling and energy recovery, a basement thermal labyrinth, a small Combined Heat and Power (CHP) engine, energy efficient lighting systems, and 50kWp of photovoltaic panels. The canal elevation is more sheltered and provides for hard landscaped dining and community areas for students.  The design achieved a RIBA West Midland Regional Award 2013

References

External links
 

Secondary schools in Birmingham, West Midlands
University Technical Colleges
Aston University
Educational institutions established in 2012
2012 establishments in England